Higher State is a dance record company and music publishing company founded in 1992 by house music producers and DJs Dillon & Dickins (Marc Dillon & Patrick Dickins) which incorporates the three record labels Higher State, 99 North and 99 Degrees.

History 
Initially, all the releases were composed by Dillon & Dickins under different aliases, e.g. Disco Biscuit, Sound Environment, Upstate, 99 Allstars & Illicit. The first release not written by Dillon & Dickins (although they did produce many of the mixes) was in November 1997 when they released Johnny X "Call on Me" (catalogue numbers 12HIMP4 & CDHSD34), which was written by Leee John (ex-singer and member of 1980s band Imagination). This was followed in April 1998 with Spacebase "What Am I Gonna Do" (catalogue number 12HSD35), which they co-wrote with the singer on the track, Kate Cameron.

The company then started licensing tracks from other companies, and had their first notable chart success in March 1999 with FPI Project "Everybody (All Over the World)" (catalogue number CDNTH14), which on 13 March 1999 for one week reached number 67 in the UK Singles Chart.

Other notable releases include Matter "Don't You Want Some More" (originally released in 1993 on Guerilla Records), M1 "Electronic Funk", 99 Allstars "Chemical Generation" (which also featured the vocals of Kate Cameron as well as male vocalist Paul Alexander from American-based dance music group The Ones) and Dillon & Dickins "Queers R Doin It".

Discography
(All catalogue numbers are stated exactly as printed on the release – multiple catalogue numbers reflect all available formats.)

Higher State

99 North

99 Degrees

See also
 Lists of record labels

References

External links
Official website
PPI Ltd Members List
Music Week Listing

99 North at Discogs
99 Degrees at Discogs
Allrecordlabels.com listing

British record labels
House music record labels
Record labels established in 1992
English electronic dance music record labels